Akwantukese Festival is a festival celebrated by the people of New Juaben traditional area in the Eastern Region of Ghana. It is celebrated to mark the epic journey of the people from Juaben in the Ashanti Region of Ghana.

History
The Akwantukese Festival commemorates the great migration of the Juabens and their allies from their ancestral homes in Asante to establish the New Juaben settlement in the Eastern Region specifically in Koforidua some 135 years ago.

References

External links
 Ghana News Agency

Festivals in Ghana